Fernando C. Kizer (1832–?) was a member of the Wisconsin State Assembly.

Biography
Kizer was born on April 27, 1832. He attended Wyoming Seminary. During the American Civil War, Kizer enlisted with the 3rd Wisconsin Volunteer Cavalry Regiment of the Union Army. He would reach the rank of captain. Engagements he took part in include the Battle of Cane Hill and the Battle of Prairie Grove.

Assembly career
Kizer was a member of the Assembly during the 1889 and 1891 sessions. He was a Republican.

References

Republican Party members of the Wisconsin State Assembly
People of Wisconsin in the American Civil War
Union Army officers
Union Army soldiers
1832 births
Year of death missing
Wyoming Seminary alumni